The 2022 Tour du Rwanda was a road cycling stage race that took place from 20 and 27 February 2022 in Rwanda. The race was rated as a category 2.1 event on the 2022 UCI Africa Tour calendar, and was the 25th edition of the Tour du Rwanda.

After the 2021 edition was postponed to early May due to the COVID-19 pandemic, the race returned to its usual late-February timeslot.

Teams 
One of the 18 UCI WorldTeams, five UCI ProTeams, nine UCI Continental teams, and four national teams make up the 19 teams that participated in the race. Of these teams, 14 entered a full squad of five riders, while the other five teams (and ) entered four riders each.  was also reduced to four riders with one late non-starter. In total, 89 riders started the race, of which 65 finished.

UCI WorldTeams

 

UCI ProTeams

 
 
 
 
 

UCI Continental Teams

 
 
 
 
 
 
 
 
 

National Teams

 Algeria
 Great Britain
 Morocco
 Rwanda

Route 
The complete route of the 2022 Tour du Rwanda was revealed on 30 November 2021. Like in previous editions, the Rwandan capital, Kigali, featured heavily in the race, being a start and/or finish location on all but one of the eight stages. While the Mur de Kigali time trial, which had featured as stage 7 of the past two editions, was not a part of the route, the cobbled hill was still climbed four times during the race. Instead, the race began with a short time trial for the first time since 2017.

Stages

Stage 1 
20 February 2022 — Kigali (Kigali Arena),  (ITT)

Stage 2 
21 February 2022 — Kigali (Amahoro Stadium) to Rwamagana,

Stage 3 
22 February 2022 — Kigali (MIC Building) to Rubavu,

Stage 4 
23 February 2022 — Kigali (Kimironko) to Gicumbi,

Stage 5 
24 February 2022 — Muhanga to Musanze,

Stage 6 
25 February 2022 — Musanze to Kigali (Kigali Convention Centre),

Stage 7 
26 February 2022 — Kigali (Nyamirambo) to Kigali (Mont Kigali),

Stage 8 
27 February 2022 — Kigali (Canal Olympia) to Kigali (Canal Olympia),

Classification leadership table 

 On stage 2, as per race regulations, Jhonatan Restrepo and Sandy Dujardin, who were the next two best-placed riders in the general classification not already leading a classification after stage 1, wore the orange-and-white and the dark blue jerseys, respectively. However, neither rider was deemed to be officially leading those respective classifications, as no points had been awarded on stage 1 for either classification.
 On stage 2, Axel Laurance, who finished fifth on stage 1, wore the red-gold-and-white jersey, as the best-placed rider not already leading a classification or wearing another classification jersey.
 On stage 3, Abram Stockman, who was second in the sprints classification, wore the dark blue jersey, because first-placed El Houcaine Sabbahi wore the orange-and-white jersey as the leader of the mountains jersey.
 On stages 4 and 5, Natnael Tesfatsion, who was second in the young rider classification, wore the blue-sky-and-yellow jersey, because first-placed Axel Laurance wore the orange-and-white jersey as the leader of the mountains classification.
 On stage 4, Ángel Madrazo, who finished third on stage 3, wore the red-gold-and-white jersey, because stage winner Jhonatan Restrepo wore the yellow jersey as the leader of the general classification, and second-placed finisher Axel Laurance wore the orange-and-white jersey as the leader of the mountains classification.
 On stage 6, Pierre Rolland, who finished second on stage 5, wore the red-gold-and-white jersey, because stage winner Alexandre Geniez wore the dark blue jersey as the leader of the sprints classification.
 On stages 7 and 8, Henok Mulubrhan, who was second in the young rider classification, wore the blue-sky-and-yellow jersey, because first-placed Natnael Tesfatsion wore the yellow jersey as the leader of the general classification.

Final classification standings

General classification

Mountains classification

Sprints classification

Young rider classification

Rwandan rider classification

African rider classification

Team classification

Notes

References

External links 
 

2022
Tour du Rwanda
Tour du Rwanda